The Woodlands of Old is a 2008 album by the Future Sound of London under the alias of their "engineer" "Yage". It is an electronic record foremost but using more traditional drums and percussion, ex-Propellerheads member Will White contributes drums, along with a number of ethnic sounding instruments, which tie in with the band's description of the album suggesting "the deserts of the middle east to the rain forests of Brazil".  A CD version of the album was released on 13 October 2008.

Track listing
 The Woodlands of Old (4:12)
 An Odd Question From A Forest Bird (3:33)
 From Thunder That Shakes (3:21)
 The Yage Letters (3:43)
 The Hunters Moon (3:22)
 Mountain Cloud Descending (3:58)
 Procession (4:04)
 Crow Hushing The Floating Woods (5:19)
 The Mahogany Tree (Shelterd) (2:40)
 He Laughed Himself To The Centre (5:55)
 Unsettling Sky (2:44)
 Humbled Before Your Presence (3:24)
 Who Had Such Foolish Care (3:59)
 Circle The Corn (3:03)
 Centipede (3:02)
 Dry Wind Blown (3:44)
 Haxaal's Dream (4:04)
 Heavily He Flies (4:13)
 The Dark Pines (3:16)
 The Sun Lends Warmth And Comfort (2:33)
 A Welcome Beneath Night's Darkness (0:59)

Crew
Produced, composed - Yage
Drums - Will White

References

External links

The Future Sound of London albums
2008 albums